Prystay or Prystai is a Ukrainian surname. Notable people include:

 Metro Prystai (1927–2013), Canadian ice hockey player
 Mykola Prystay (born 1954), Ukrainian footballer and coach

Ukrainian-language surnames